Jouni Ilomäki (born 5 February 1960) is a Finnish wrestler. He competed at the 1984 Summer Olympics and the 1988 Summer Olympics.

References

External links
 

1960 births
Living people
Finnish male sport wrestlers
Olympic wrestlers of Finland
Wrestlers at the 1984 Summer Olympics
Wrestlers at the 1988 Summer Olympics
People from Lapua
Sportspeople from South Ostrobothnia